Drappier is a Champagne producer based in the Urville region of Champagne. The house, founded in 1808, produces both vintage and non-vintage cuvee as well as a prestige wine known as Grande Sendrée.

Drappier Champagne produces an unsulfured Champagne, Brut Nature Zéro Dosage Sans Souffre NV, a Blanc de noirs.

Drappier is considered one of the finest boutique champagne producers in the world. Drappier produces about 1.6 million bottles of champagne a year. The  cellars in which the wine is stored are among the oldest and most extensive in Europe, and were the only cellars that were not damaged during the two world wars or the fires that raced through the area in the 1950s.

Drappier is known for using significantly less sulfur in their wine than many other Champagne producers. One of their cuvées, the Brut Nature Non Dosé Sans Soufre, contains no added sulfur whatsoever.

See also
 List of Champagne houses

References

Champagne producers